C. Granville Wyche House is a historic home located at Greenville, South Carolina. It was built in 1931, and consists of a two-story, five bay central blocked flanked by one-story balconied projections.  It is of blond brick in the Italian Renaissance style with a low-pitched tile roof, wide eaves with brackets, and full-length, first floor windows. It features a massive portico with grouped classical columns and pilasters.  Also on the property is a small grotto and an unpainted barn dating from the mid-1930s.

It was added to the National Register of Historic Places in 1993.

References

Houses on the National Register of Historic Places in South Carolina
Renaissance Revival architecture in South Carolina
Houses completed in 1931
Houses in Greenville, South Carolina
National Register of Historic Places in Greenville, South Carolina